Ali Khan (also Romanized as ʿAlī Khān; also known as Deh-e ‘Alī Khān) is a village in Margan Rural District, in the Central District of Hirmand County, Sistan and Baluchestan Province, Iran. At the 2006 census, its population was 66, in 14 families.

References 

Populated places in Hirmand County